Lee Suk-tae (born 12 April 1973) is a South Korean sport shooter who competed in the 2004 Summer Olympics.

References

1973 births
Living people
South Korean male sport shooters
Skeet shooters
Olympic shooters of South Korea
Shooters at the 2004 Summer Olympics
Shooters at the 1994 Asian Games
Shooters at the 2002 Asian Games
Kyung Hee University alumni
Sportspeople from North Gyeongsang Province
Asian Games competitors for South Korea
20th-century South Korean people
21st-century South Korean people